The Canada women's national under-18 and under-19 basketball team is a national basketball team of Canada, governed by Canada Basketball.

It represents the country in international under-18 and under-19 (under age 18 and under age 19) women's basketball competitions.

See also
Canada women's national basketball team
Canada women's national under-17 basketball team
Canada men's national under-19 basketball team

References

External links
Archived records of Canada team participations

under
Women's national under-19 basketball teams